Raju Khadka (born 11 September 1975) is a former Nepalese cricketer. All-rounder Raju is a right-hand batsman and a right-arm medium-fast bowler. He made his debut for Nepal against Bangladesh in September 1996.

Raju Khadka became the first Nepalese cricketer to score an international century, when he slammed an unbeaten 105 off just 50 balls against Bhutan during the 2003 ACC Emerging Nations Tournament in March 2003.

He represents the Region no. 4 Bhairahawa of the National League.

Biography 

Born in Nepal in 1975, Raju Khadka first played for Nepal in the 1996 ACC Trophy, which was held in Malaysia. He played in the tournament again in 1998, 2000 and 2002, captaining the side to a runners-up slot in the latter tournament.

He made his first-class début in 2004, playing in the 2004 ICC Intercontinental Cup against the UAE and Malaysia. Later in the year, he played in the 2004 ACC Trophy in Kuala Lumpur and ACC Fast Track Countries Tournament matches against Singapore and the UAE. The match against the UAE was his last for Nepal.

Coaching 

Currently he is teaching as a game teacher in  Little Flower School, Narayangarh, Chitwan and He is head coach of Cricket Academy of Chitwan .

References 

1975 births
Living people
Nepalese cricketers
Nepalese cricket captains